Changtang Town is an urban town in and subdivision of Anhua County, Hunan Province, People's Republic of China.

Administrative division
The town is divided into 17 villages and 2 communities, the following areas: Linshantangchong Community, Changtang Community, Lanxi Village, Luoxi Village, Zhongshan Village, Xinbaiyang Village, Shihua Village, Gonghe Village, Jiangyi Village, Waliu Village, Yangtian Village, Yonghe Village, Hexin Village, Bohuatai Village, Dajinxi Village, Hezhen Village, Yuefeng Village, Yashan Village, and Jinyin Village (林山塘冲社区、长塘社区、兰溪村、罗溪村、中山村、新白羊村、石花村、共和村、蒋义村、瓦柳村、杨田村、永和村、合欣村、箔花台村、大金溪村、合振村、岳峰村、丫山村、金银村).

References

External links

Divisions of Anhua County